The Toyota Junior Golf World Cup is an annual world amateur team golf championship for youths under 18 organized in Japan with Toyota Motor Corporation as title sponsor. The inaugural event for boys was held in 1992 and for girls in 2014.

Past participants include Hideki Matsuyama, Branden Grace, Justin Rose, Henrik Stenson, Hunter Mahan, Russell Henley, Trevor Immelman, Danny Willett, Brendon de Jonge, Alex Norén, Yūsaku Miyazato, Yuta Ikeda, Satoshi Kodaira, Camilo Villegas, Jon Rahm, Hideto Tanihara, Shunsuke Sonoda and Yosuke Asaji. In 2001, South Africa won the event with a team that featured future major champions Louis Oosthuizen and Charl Schwartzel.

Format
Continental/regional qualifiers are held to limit the field to 24 teams. The tournament format is 72 holes of stroke play over four days with teams of four (boys) and three (girls). The winning team is presented with the Toyota Cup.

Results

Boys' tournament

Source:

Girls' tournament

Source:

Results summary

Boys' tournament

Girls' tournament

See also
World Junior Girls Championship

References

External links
Pasts results on the Junior Golf World Cup's site

Amateur golf tournaments
Team golf tournaments
Junior golf tournaments
Golf tournaments in Asia
Recurring sporting events established in 1992